For the state pageant affiliated with Miss Teen USA, see Miss Nevada Teen USA

The Miss Nevada's Outstanding Teen competition is the pageant that selects the representative for the U.S. state of Nevada in Miss America's Outstanding Teen pageant.

Megan Dwyer of Elko was crowned Miss Nevada's Outstanding Teen on July 2, 2022 at Bally’s Showroom in South Lake Tahoe, Nevada. She competed for the title of Miss America's Outstanding Teen 2023 at the Hyatt Regency Dallas in Dallas, Texas on August 12, 2022 where she was a Teens in Action finalist and a recipient of an award for being a top 4 scholarship fundraiser.

Results summary 
The year in parentheses indicates the Miss America's Outstanding Teen competition the award/placement was garnered.

Placements 
 Top 10: Lauren Watson (2016)

Awards

Other awards 
 Miss Congeniality/Spirit of America: Amy Smith (2015)
 America's Choice: Lauren Watson (2016)
Non-finalist Interview: Tia Henderson (2019)
 Teens in Action Award Winners: Amy Smith (2015)
 Teens in Action Award Finalists: Ellie Smith (2013), Megan Dwyer (2023)

Winners

References

External links 
 

Nevada
Nevada culture
Women in Nevada
Annual events in Nevada